Mne Ne Nuzhna Informatsiya (meaning "I Don't Need The Information") is a 1992 remix album by Technology. It features re-recorded versions of a selection of songs which had originally appeared on the album Vsyo, chto ty khochesh.

Track listing

Mne Ne Nuzhna Informatsiya
 SK05-35 – Cassette edition

 "Polchasa" (Halt an hour) [New Mix/Gala Mix]
 "Informatsiya" (Information) [new track!]
 "Shutnik" (Jester) [Mega mix]
 "Pesni Ni O Chyom" (Songs about nothing) [House Mix]
 "Segodnya Nochyu" (Today at night) [new track!]
 "Vsyo, Chto Ty Khochesh" (All that you want) [Beg Mix/Next Mix]
 "Kholodny Sled" (Cold trail) [Metal Mix]
 "Shutnik" (Jester) [Sympho Mis/House Mix]

Mne Ne Nuzhna Informatsiya(re-release 2003)
 010 254-2 – CD edition

References

External links
 

1992 compilation albums
1992 remix albums
Russian-language compilation albums
Technology (band) albums